Ravadanaq (also Romanized as Ravādānaq; also known as Iravadāna, Ravārānaq, and Rovādānaq) is a village in Ozomdel-e Jonubi Rural District, in the Central District of Varzaqan County, East Azerbaijan Province, Iran. At the 2006 census, its population was 186, in 40 families.

References 

Towns and villages in Varzaqan County